An indigenous territory is an area of land set aside for the use of indigenous peoples in a country that is largely populated by colonists from another region, typically Europe.
The term may refer to 
Indigenous territory (Brazil)
Indigenous territory (Bolivia)
Indigenous territory (Colombia)
Indigenous territory (Costa Rica)
Indigenous and community conserved area, a concept defined by the IUCN

See also 
Indigenous Protected Area, area defined under a system of land management whereby traditional owners manage flora and fauna in protected areas of Australia